Thomas Rutherford Brett (October 2, 1931 – February 6, 2021) was a United States district judge of the United States District Court for the Northern District of Oklahoma.

Education and career

Born in Oklahoma City, Oklahoma, Brett received a Bachelor of Business Administration from the University of Oklahoma in 1952, a Bachelor of Laws from the University of Oklahoma College of Law in 1957, and a Juris Doctor from the same institution in 1971. He was a lieutenant in the United States Army from 1954 to 1955, and was thereafter a reserve colonel in the United States Army JAG Corps until 1981. He was an assistant county attorney in Tulsa, Oklahoma from 1957 to 1958, and was then in private practice in Tulsa until 1979.

Federal judicial service

On September 28, 1979, Brett was nominated by President Jimmy Carter to a new seat on the United States District Court for the Northern District of Oklahoma created by 92 Stat. 1629. He was confirmed by the United States Senate on October 31, 1979, and received his commission on November 2, 1979. He served as Chief Judge from 1994 to 1996, assuming senior status on October 3, 1996. Brett served in that capacity until his retirement on February 1, 2003.

Death 
Brett died on February 6, 2021, at age 89, in Tulsa, Oklahoma.

References

Sources
 

1931 births
2021 deaths
20th-century American judges
21st-century American judges
Judges of the United States District Court for the Northern District of Oklahoma
Lawyers from Oklahoma City
Oklahoma lawyers
Military personnel from Oklahoma
University of Oklahoma alumni
University of Oklahoma College of Law alumni
United States Army officers
United States Army reservists
United States district court judges appointed by Jimmy Carter